Spring Creek is a stream in northwestern Newton County, Missouri. It is a tributary of Shoal Creek.

The stream flows northeast passing under and running along Missouri Route 86.

Spring Creek was so named for the fact it is fed by a spring in its headwaters.

See also
List of rivers of Missouri

References

Rivers of Newton County, Missouri
Rivers of Missouri